Blomidon may refer to:

 Blomidon, Nova Scotia, Canada
 Cape Blomidon, Nova Scotia, Canada
 Blomidon Provincial Park, Nova Scotia Canada
 Blomidon Golf & Country Club, Newfoundland, Canada